Lotfi Sellami (born 26 December 1978) is a retired Tunisian football defender and later manager.

References

1978 births
Living people
People from Kairouan
Tunisian footballers
Tunisia international footballers
JS Kairouan players
Étoile Sportive du Sahel players
Stade Gabèsien players
Association football defenders
Tunisian Ligue Professionnelle 1 players
Tunisian expatriate football managers
Expatriate football managers in Saudi Arabia
Tunisian expatriate sportspeople in Saudi Arabia
Tunisian football managers
AS Gabès managers
CS Hammam-Lif managers